Paramachaerium schunkei is a species of flowering plant in the family Fabaceae. It is found only in Peru. The species was described and named by Velva E. Rudd in 1981.

References

Dalbergieae
Flora of Peru
Vulnerable plants
Taxonomy articles created by Polbot